The 1975 Vancouver Whitecaps season was the second season of the Whitecaps, and their second season in the North American Soccer League and the top flight of Canadian soccer.

This was manager Jim Easton's last season with the club and the club showed improvement over their inaugural season. The season started brightly with five wins including those over Seattle and Toronto at home. The rest of the season had mixed results, but the Whitecaps well and truly fell out of playoff contention by losing seven of their last ten games. Barring the 3-0 loss away to the Seattle Sounders on July 19, 1975, the games were close one goal losses. In the last two games of the season, the Whitecaps trounced Denver and San Jose 6-0 and 4-0. The Whitecaps finished at 0.500 with eleven wins and losses at fourth in the Pacific Division.  Local resident Glen Johnston led the Whitecaps with eight goals and seven assists while Sam Lenarduzzi and Bruce Wilson played all 22 games. Sergio Zanatta and Barrie Mitchell also had strong seasons on the score sheet.

The Whitecaps also played a friendly match against the New York Cosmos and the newly signed Pele on July 7, 1975, with 26,495 in attendance.

Club

Roster 

The 1975 squad

Team management 
Jim Easton was Vancouver Whitecaps manager in 1975 and saw good success during his tenure with a small budget and local players.

Results

Results by round

Match results

Mid-season friendlies

See also
 History of Vancouver Whitecaps FC

References

Vancouver Whitecaps (1974–1984) seasons
Vancouver Whitecaps Season, 1975
Vancouver Whitecaps
Vancouver Whitecaps